The Dragović Monastery is a Serbian Orthodox monastery situated on a hill downstream the Cetina River not far from Vrlika in Croatia. When the artificial Peruća Lake was created, the original monastery sank due to land movement. The new monastery Dragović was built on a hill not far from the previous one.

Dragović Monastery, which, along with the monasteries of Krka and Krupa, has been a spiritual cornerstone for the Serbian Orthodox people in Dalmatia for many centuries. Dragović Monastery is a monastery of the Diocese of the Dalmatian Serbian Orthodox Church, located in the village of Koljane.

Based on the chronicle "History of the Holy Nativity Monastery Dragović in the Orthodox Diocese of Dalmatia" created by the first pastor Gerasim Petranović from 1859, the monastery was named after Drago who moved with his brothers from Bosnia to the Cetina region. While according to folklore, the monastery is named after the river that sprang near the old place of the monastery.

It is located not far from Vrlika, next to Peruća Lake, 20 kilometers from Knin. During its existence, the location was changed three times, and it served and experienced the harsh fate of the Serbian people in Dalmatia in the past as well as in recent times.

History

According to official Serb Orthodox schematism published until late 19th century there is no known historical information about the foundation. According to a baseless folk story by Orthodox clergy which can be traced to 1811, but mainly invented and promoted by Nikodim Milaš in his Pravoslavna Dalmacija (1901), the Dragović Monastery was built in 1395, six years after the Battle of Kosovo, and after the death of Bosnian King Tvrtko, when supposedly Serbs from Bosnia moved en masse to Dalmatia, where they built this monastery. Some other unsourced historical accounts about the monastery are also his invention. There was no institutional (Serb) Orthodoxy in the 1468/69 Bosnia, Orthodoxy spread in Bosnia only with the Ottoman advance, and in the mid-15th century it was present only in Eastern and Southeastern parts of Bosnian-Serbian border. 

Archaeologically the late medieval layer still is not confirmed, in the sources cannot be confirmed existence of a Catholic church on the site, and non-Orthodox elements found in the monastery possibly were introduced from nearby medieval Catholic church from Gornje Koljane. Based on reliable historical sources the monastery was possibly founded before the restoration of Serbian Patriarchate of Peć in 1557, and most probably by the end of the 16th century, but it would become desolate for a long time. In the late 17th century (1694), Orthodox bishop Nikodim Busović was given by Venetian authorities permission to rebuild the abandoned monastery, antica chiesa et monastero habitato da calogeri, by which was officially founded the Orthodox hierarchy and custom, but the monastery had a complex relationship to both Catholic and Orthodox authorities. Amid bad relations with Greek Catholics in Šibenik and Roman Catholic hierarchy, Busović in the end retreated from the position of bishop and died at the monastery.

The grounds on which Dragović rested were highly unstable and this, together with increasing moisture, convinced the monks to move the monastery to a better location. With Venetian permission, in 1777 hieromonk Vikentije Stojisavljević began to build the new monastery in the Vinogradi. The monastery's reconstruction was very long and financially exhausting until prior Jerotej Kovačević finally supervised its completion. It eventually opened on 20 August 1867.

Recent history

In 1959, when the artificial lake for the hydroelectric power station Peruća had been made by the Yugoslav Communists, monastery Dragović was moved on a hill not far from the old fortress called Gradina.

Between 1991 and 1993, during the Croatian War of Independence, the monastery was broken into several times, and in 1995 it was abandoned, after which the church was devastated and desecrated, making it unhabitable. Later, Bishop Fotije gave his blessing to Father Đorđe Knežević to begin with the reconstruction of the monastery. In autumn 2004, basic conditions were achieved for the return of monks. Thus with the decree of Bishop Fotije, on 15 September 2004 monastery Dragović received a new brotherhood, and hieromonk Varsonufije (Rašković) was appointed their Father Superior. On the same day due to the feast of the Nativity of the Theotokos, the first Holy Hierarchal Liturgy was served in the reconstructed monastery's church.

In this way, the tradition of the gathering of Orthodox in this monastery has been established again. This assembly occurs every year on Sunday before the feast of the Nativity of the Theotokos.

Treasury
Monastery Dragović used to have a rich treasury, in which was kept a number of manuscripts from 16th-18th centuries, as well as very old books written in Greek, Latin, Italian, Russian and Church Slavic.

There were also very rare antimens, among which was one made by Hristofor Zefarović dating from 1752.  A great number of sacral objects mainly made in silver granulation and filigree from the 18th century were also a part of this rich treasury.

In the monastery’s church, a part of Saint Gregory’s relics was kept - Saint Gregory was a Serbian enlighter and Archbishop who was allegedly a descendant of Saint Nemanjić family.

Gallery

See also 
 List of Serb Orthodox Monasteries
 Serbs of Croatia

References

External links
Official page (Serbian)

Serbian Orthodox monasteries in Croatia
Christian monasteries established in the 14th century
Destroyed churches in Croatia
Rebuilt churches
Medieval sites in Croatia
Rebuilt buildings and structures in Croatia
Buildings and structures in Split-Dalmatia County